Leon Bazyli Sapieha (March 20, 1652 – November 9, 1686) was a Polish-Lithuanian politician. He was the  treasurer of the Lithuanian court and Lithuanian army general and member of the noble Sapieha family. He was the son of Paweł Jan Sapieha and brother to Jan Kazimierz Sapieha the Younger, amongst many other siblings.

In the years 1663–1668 he studied at the University of Wilno, then for several years traveled around Europe, including a visit to Paris. He returned to the country about 1673. He was an envoy to the Diet of Grodno in 1678. He was an envoy to the sejm in 1681, where he was appointed treasurer of the court. He was also a sejm delegate in 1683.

He took part in the Polish relief expedition to Vienna in 1683, under King Jan Sobieski. In 1684 he was appointed general of the Lithuanian army and in 1683 he participated in the campaign against Ottoman Turkey.

He died in Warsaw on November 9, 1686 as a result of an accidental firing of a gun. After his death, a notable sepulchral monument of Sapieha was made  around 1687, an original composition in the style of the great works by Bernini.

References

Generals of the Polish–Lithuanian Commonwealth
1652 births
1686 deaths
Leon
Vilnius University alumni